Prunus speciosa, the Oshima cherry, Japanese オオシマザクラ (Oshima zakura), is native to Izu Ōshima island and the Izu Peninsula on Honshū near Tokyo, Japan.

Description
The leaves are 5–10 cm long and 3–6 cm broad, with a double-toothed margin, and an acuminate apex.

The flowers are 2.5–4 cm diameter, with five white petals, gold stamens and brown sepals; they grow in clusters in the spring, and are hermaphroditic. The fruit is a small black cherry about 1 cm diameter.

A tree 8 m in circumference and 800 years old is known on Ōshima island. It has been designated a national treasure.

Cultivation and cultivar

The Oshima cherry, is widely cultivated as an ornamental tree. Because of its large, showy flowers it is planted in many gardens and parks. It prefers sun and moist but well draining soil.

There are many cultivars. It is also a hybrid parent of many of the sakura flowering cherry cultivars. Among these cultivars, those that originated from Oshima cherry are called Cerasus Sato-zakura Group, and many cultivars have a large number of petals, and the representative cultivar is Prunus lannesiana ‘Kanzan’ or ‘Sekiyama’. The reason for this is that Oshima cherry tend to mutate into double-flowered, grow fast, have many large flowers, and have a strong fragrance, so they have been favored for cherry blossom viewing because of their characteristics. When the population of the southern Kanto region increased during the medieval Kamakura period, Oshima cherry, which was originally from Izu Ōshima Island, was brought to Honshu and started to be cultivated there, and then brought to the capital, Kyoto. In the Muromachi period, Prunus lannesiana 'Albo-rosea' Makino (Fugenzou) and Prunus serrulata 'Mikurumakaisi' (Mikuruma gaeshi) derived from Oshima cherry were born, and in the Edo period, various kinds of Cerasus Sato-zakura Group such as ‘Kanzan’ were born, and many cultivars have been succeeded until now.

Oshima cherry is a paternal species of Yoshino cherry.

Food
The fruit is also edible. The flowers when dried are used to make tea. The leaves (sakura leaf or cherry leaf) are used in cooking and medicine to make 'cherry tree rice cake', but P. speciosa is not the only sakura leaf.

Classification
The plant was first described by Gen'ichi Koidzumi as Prunus jamasakura var. speciosa, and later treated as a separate species by Collingwood Ingram (1880-1981). It is occasionally treated as a synonym of Prunus lannesiana. or (particularly in Japan) as a variety of it, Prunus lannesiana var. speciosa (Koidz.) Makino. The name speciosa in Latin means "the beautiful", a name which must apply to the blossoming tree.

See also
Cherry blossom
Hanami
Sakura

References

External links

speciosa
Flora of Japan
Cherry blossom
Trees of Japan
Edible plants
Garden plants of Asia
Ornamental trees